Trechus dilutus is a species of ground beetle in the subfamily Trechinae. It was described by Thomas Vernon Wollaston in 1854.

References

dilutus
Beetles described in 1854